Magic's Child is the third  installment in Justine Larbalestier's Magic or Madness trilogy. 
It talks about Reason Cansino trying to tell Danny Galeano that she is pregnant with his child and that Jason Blake is coming close to succeeding.

References

External links
justinelarbalestier.com

2007 Australian novels
Australian fantasy novels